"If I Rise" is a song performed by A. R. Rahman and Dido, composed by A. R. Rahman, with lyrics by Dido and Rollo Armstrong. The song featured as the main theme for the Danny Boyle film 127 Hours.

The song won numerous awards including Broadcast Film Critics Association Award and  Denver Film Critics Society Award. It was also nominated for Best Song Award at the Academy Awards and World Soundtrack Awards.

Background
The song was featured in the climax scene of the film. The chorus portion of the song is sung by The Gleehive Children's Choir, Mumbai. The choir includes Jervis Dias, Kristen Fernandes, Alisha Pais, Jessica Dmello, Sherize Alveyn, Evania Cerejo, Jemima Fernandes, and Aidan D'silva. The portion was recorded at Octavious Studio, Bandra, Mumbai. The song was nominated for an Academy Award in the category of Best Original Song.

Music video
The song was first picturised in the climax scene of the film. The official music video, featuring Dido and A. R. Rahman, was released in February 2011. Dido first confirmed on her official website that she and Rahman were going to film a video for the song. The music video was premiered on the Wall Street Journal website on 17 February. It has A. R. Rahman playing harpejji, which was the major instrument used in the track, and Dido singing the track along with Rahman. A few scenes from the film, mainly featuring James Franco, are also used in the video.

Live performances

Florence Welch was asked by Dido, who was pregnant at the time, to perform "If I Rise" at the Academy Awards. She was joined by A. R. Rahman for the first live performance of the song.

Accolades

The song was nominated for an Academy Award in the category of Best Original Song. However, it lost to Randy Newman's "We Belong Together" from Toy Story 3. The Academy's decision not to award Rahman for the song evoked widespread criticisms in India. Apart from public responses, several actors also commented on it. Shabana Azmi said, "A. R. Rahman truly deserved the Oscar for Best Song this year." Konkona Sen Sharma also tweeted the same opinion. Sandhya Mridul said, "A.R Rahman stands apart he deserves every win". However, Rahman himself has stated that he personally believes Newman deserved the award.

Cover version

A single titled "Hours - If I Rise (vocal) Remix" was released on 4 February 2012.  This is credited as performed by Katie Campbell (an artist with credits including a wide variety of cover versions of original famous and semi-popular movie songs) & Brian "Hacksaw" Williams, and notes a runtime of 3:03.

References

External links 
 
 
  A. R. Rahman and Florence Welch performing "If I Rise" at the 83rd Academy Awards
 
 

2010 songs
Dido (singer) songs
Songs written by Dido (singer)
Songs with music by A. R. Rahman
Songs written for films
2010 singles
Interscope Records singles
Songs written by Rollo Armstrong